Antony Harold Newton, Baron Newton of Braintree, OBE, PC, DL (29 August 1937 – 25 March 2012) was a British Conservative politician and former Cabinet member.  He was the member of Parliament for Braintree from 1974 to 1997, and was later a member of the House of Lords.

Early life
Newton was born in Harwich, Essex. He was educated at Friends School Saffron Walden and Trinity College, Oxford, where he was President of Oxford University Conservative Association and the Union. He unsuccessfully fought Sheffield Brightside in the 1970 General Election. In the 1972 Birthday Honours, Newton was appointed to the Order of the British Empire as an Officer (OBE).

Member of Parliament
Newton was first elected for the new constituency of Braintree in February 1974 with a majority of 2,001, and successfully retained the seat in the October 1974 general election with a reduced majority of 1,090. The Conservative victory at the 1979 general election boosted his majority dramatically to 12,518, and it increased at every subsequent election to a high of 17,494 at the 1992 general election before his defeat in the Labour landslide at the 1997 general election by 1,451 votes.

In government
Newton was appointed a government whip when the Conservatives came to power in 1979.  In 1982 he moved to a junior ministerial position at the Department of Health and Social Security, where he remained until 1988, becoming Minister for Social Security and Disabled People in 1984, and Minister for Health in 1986.

In the 1988 New Year Honours, Newton was sworn of the Privy Council. He became Chancellor of the Duchy of Lancaster and a minister at the DTI for a year, before being promoted to Secretary of State for Social Security from 1989 to 1992, and then taking up the positions of Lord President of the Council and Leader of the House of Commons until 1997. From 1992 to 1995, he answered to Prime Minister’s Questions when Major was not present. His discretion about Major's four-year affair with Edwina Currie is credited with enabling Major to become prime minister.

Peerage
In the 1997 Prime Minister's Resignation Honours, after Newton lost his seat, he was raised to the peerage as Baron Newton of Braintree, of Coggeshall in the County of Essex on 31 October 1997.

He attempted to be selected for the 1999 European Parliament Election, but was unsuccessful.

In 1998 he was appointed a professional standards director of the Institute of Directors, a position he held until 2004.

Newton chaired the Hansard Society Commission on Parliamentary Scrutiny which ran from 1999 to 2001. The Commission concluded that Parliament was being left behind by changes in the constitution, government and society and set out reforms for improving its function.

He became a chairman of the Further Education Funding Council for East Region, serving between 1998 and 2001, the privy councillors' committee on the Anti-Terrorism, Crime and Security Act 2001 between 2002 and 2004, the Tax Law Rewrite Steering Committee between 2007 and 2010), the North East Essex Mental Health NHS Trust between 1997 and 2001, the Royal Brompton and Harefield NHS Trust between 2001 and 2009, East Anglia's Children's Hospices between 1998 and 2002 and Help the Hospices between 2002 and 2010, the Council on Tribunals (1998-2007), and its successor the Administrative Justice and Tribunals Council (2007–2009); the Standing Conference on Drug Abuse (1997–2001). He became a deputy lieutenant of Essex in 2002

Personal life
Newton was married to Janet Huxley from 25 August 1962 until they divorced in 1986. He married Patricia Gilthorpe née Thomson on 26 September 1986. Her first husband had died. 

Newton was a heavy smoker from an early age. He died at Colchester Hospital of chronic obstructive pulmonary disease on 25 March 2012. He was survived by his two daughters from his first marriage.

References

External links

|-

|-

|-

|-

|-

1937 births
2012 deaths
Alumni of Trinity College, Oxford
British Secretaries of State
Chancellors of the Duchy of Lancaster
Conservative Party (UK) MPs for English constituencies
Conservative Party (UK) life peers
Deaths from chronic obstructive pulmonary disease
Deputy Lieutenants of Essex
Leaders of the House of Commons of the United Kingdom
Lord Presidents of the Council
Members of the Bow Group
Members of the Privy Council of the United Kingdom
Officers of the Order of the British Empire
Life peers created by Elizabeth II
People educated at Friends School Saffron Walden
People from Harwich
Presidents of the Oxford Union
Presidents of the Oxford University Conservative Association
UK MPs 1974
UK MPs 1974–1979
UK MPs 1979–1983
UK MPs 1983–1987
UK MPs 1987–1992
UK MPs 1992–1997